The Kintner-McGrain House, also known as Cedar Glade, is on the National Register of Historic Places, located north of downtown Corydon, Indiana. It attained the "Cedar Glade" name due to the giant red cedars Jacob Kinter, the builder, planted in front of the house.  It has been owned by three different families: Kintners (1808), McGrains(1849), and Bennetts (1998).  It is the second-oldest building in Harrison County, Indiana.  It was built in 1808, and is a Late Federal/Early Republic Style, "L"-shaped, brick dwelling. During John Hunt Morgan's raid in 1863, noncombatants took refuge in the house.  Ironically, several cannonballs landed in the front yard. Until 1946 it was a working farm.

It was added to the National Register of Historic Places in 1983.

See also
Kintner House Hotel
Kintner-Withers House

References

Kintner Family Architectural Influence in Harrison County Indiana
History of Cedar Glade

External links
Courier-Journal article from December 1999

Corydon, Indiana
Houses on the National Register of Historic Places in Indiana
Federal architecture in Indiana
Houses completed in 1808
National Register of Historic Places in Harrison County, Indiana
Houses in Harrison County, Indiana